Balaram Mukhopadhyay (Bengali: বলরাম মুখোপাধ্যায়: born 1973) is an Indian Bengali carbohydrate chemist and a professor at the department of chemical sciences of the Indian Institute of Science Education and Research, Kolkata. Balaram is mainly known for his work in the field of synthetic carbohydrate chemistry. He was given the Excellence in Carbohydrate Research Award by the Association of Carbohydrate Chemists and Technologists India (ACCTI) in 2018 for his contribution towards field of carbohydrates.

Biography and career 

Balaram Mukhopadhyay, born on January 12, 1973, in Bankura, a district town in the Indian state West Bengal, graduated with honors in chemistry from the Bankura Christian College in 1994 and followed it up with a master's degree from the Burdwan university in 1996. His journey with the world of carbohydrates is started when he enrolled for doctoral studies at the Indian Association For The Cultivation Of Science (IACS), Kolkata, under the guidance of Prof. Nirmolendu Roy and after securing a Ph.D. in 2001, he moved to the UK for the post-doctoral studies, under the supervision of Robert A Field of the University of East Anglia, Norwich, UK (2001 - 2005).
After 4 years of Post-doctoral studies, Balaram joined as a Scientist-C at the Medicinal and Process Chemistry Division in Central Drug Research Institute (CDRI), Lucknow. He left CDRI at 2008 and joined as an assistant professor at Indian Institute of Science Education and Research, Kolkata (IISER Kolkata), where he now holds a position of Professor. At IISER, he heads a laboratory, named Sweet Lab, where he hosts several researchers.

Balaram focuses his research mainly in oligosaccharide synthesis and published a number of articles. Later he also explored the fields like Glyco-nanoparticles, Supramolecular chemistry of carbohydrate gels and crystals, Carbohydrate protein interaction.

He becomes a member of the editorial board of the international peer reviewed scientific journal Carbohydrate Research in 2017.

Research Interest 
The prime research focus of Balaram is to develop strategies for the chemical synthesis of biologically relevant oligosaccharides from bacterial or plant origin. He and his group synthesized several bacterial O-antigen repeating units of E. Coli, Shigella, Salmonella and Pseudomonas to name a few. En route to the total synthesis of this complex oligosaccharides, he along with his group is developing methodologies for the rational protecting group manipulations to prepare suitable monosaccharides building blocks and stereo/regioselective glycosylation. Depending on the carbohydrate-lectin interaction, Balaram's group is developing carbohydrate decorated multivalent dendrimers as lectin sensors. Also looking at the scopes of developing multifunctional gel materials through the supramolecular architecture of carbohydrate small molecules.

Selected publications

Synthesis of biologically relevant oligosaccharides from plant and bacterial origin  

 Synthesis of the tetrasaccharide related to the repeating unit of the O-antigen from Azospirillum brasilense Jm125A2 in the form of its 2-aminoethyl glycoside:  Vikramjit Sarkar and Balaram Mukhopadhyay, Carbohydrate Research 2018, 470, 13–18.
 Synthesis of Two Hexasaccharides Related to the Repeating Unit of the O-Antigen from Escherichia coli TD2158: Kumar Bhaskar Pal and Balaram Mukhopadhyay, ChemistrySelect 2017, 2, 7378–7381.
 Concise synthesis of two trisaccharides related to the saponin isolated from Centratherum anthelminticum: Santanu Mandal and Balaram Mukhopadhyay, Tetrahedron 2007, 63, 11363–11370.
 Glycosylated N-sulfonylamidines: Highly efficient copper catalyzed multicomponent reaction with sugar alkynes, sulfonyl azides and amines: Santanu Mandal, Harsh Mohan Gauniyal, Kausikisankar Pramanik, Balaram Mukhopadhyay, Journal of Organic Chemistry 2007, 72, 9753–9756.

Novel methodologies for protecting group manipulations and glycosylation 

 Sulfuric acid immobilized on silica: an efficient promoter for one-pot acetalation–acetylation of sugar derivatives: Balaram Mukhopadhyay, Tetrahedron Letters 2006, 47, 4337–4341.
 H2SO4-silica promoted “on-column” removal of benzylidene, isopropylidene, trityl and tert-butyldimethylsilyl groups: Bimalendu Roy, Priya Verma, Balaram Mukhopadhyay, Carbohydrate Research 2009, 344, 145–148.
 A one-pot synthesis of novel sugar derived 5,6-dihydro-quinazolino[4,3-b]quinazolin-8-ones: an entry towards highly functionalized sugar-heterocyclic hybrids: Abhijeet Deb Roy, Arunachalam Subramanian, Balaram Mukhopadhyay, Raja Roy, Tetrahedron Letters 2006, 47, 6857–6860.
 Hydrogen bonding-induced conformational change in a crystalline sugar derivative: Kumar Bhaskar Pal, Vikramjit Sarkar and Balaram Mukhopadhyay, Crystal Engineering Communications 2016, 18, 1156-1163.

Carbohydrate materials, metal-carbohydrate complexes and glyco nanoparticles 

 Samarium trifluoromethanesulfonate: an efficient moisture tolerant acylation catalyst under solvent free condition: Bimalendu Roy, Somnath Dasgupta, Vishal Kumar Rajput and Balaram Mukhopadhyay, Journal of Carbohydrate Chemistry 2008, 27, 1–9.
 Organoiridium complexes: efficient catalysts for the formation of sugar acetals and ketals: Soumik Mandal, Prashant Ranjan Verma, Balaram Mukhopadhyay, Parna Gupta Carbohydrate Research 2011, 346, 2007–2010.
 Phase-selective carbohydrate gelator: Somnath Mukherjee and Balaram Mukhopadhyay RSC Advances 2012, 2(6), 2270 - 2273.
 Carbohydrates in Fluoride Sensing: Use of Cyclodextrin and CNC-Based Chemical Probes: Rituparna Das and Balaram Mukhopadhyay, ChemistrySelect, 2017, 2, 4499–4504.

Selected publications 

 Streamlined Synthesis of Per-O-acetylated Sugars, Glycosyl Iodides or Thioglycosides from Unprotected Sugars, Balaram Mukhopadhyay, K. P. R. Kartha, D. A. Russell and R. A. Field, Journal of Organic Chemistry 2004, 69, 7758–7760.
 A one-pot synthesis of novel sugar derived 5,6-dihydro-quinazolino[4,3-b]quinazolin-8-ones: an entry towards highly functionalized sugar-heterocyclic hybrids: Abhijeet Deb Roy, Arunachalam Subramanian, Balaram Mukhopadhyay, Raja Roy, Tetrahedron Letters 2006, 47, 6857–6860.
 Glycosylated N-sulfonylamidines: Highly efficient copper catalyzed multicomponent reaction with sugar alkynes, sulfonyl azides and amines: Santanu Mandal, Harsh Mohan Gauniyal, Kausikisankar Pramanik, Balaram Mukhopadhyay, Journal of Organic Chemistry 2007, 72, 9753–9756.
 Chemical O-glycosylations: an overview: Rituparna Das and Balaram Mukhopadhyay, ChemistryOPEN 2016, 5, 401–433.
 Synthesis and evaluation of iminocoumaryl and coumaryl derivatized glycosides as galectin antagonists: Vishal Kumar Rajput, Hakon Leffler, Ulf J. Nilsson and Balaram Mukhopadhyay, Bioorganic & Medicinal Chemistry Letters 2014, 24, 3516–3520.

Book chapters 

 Iodine monobromide - update. R. A. Field and B. Mukhopadhyay in Encyclopedia of Reagents in Organic Synthesis, L. Paquette, P. Fuchs, D. Crich and P. Wipf Eds., John Wiley and Sons Ltd, 2004.
 Synthetic Glycans, Glycoarrays, and Glyconanoparticles To Investigate Host Infection by Trypanosoma cruzi Robert A. Field, Peterson Andrade, Vanessa L. Campo, Ivone Carvalho, Beatrice Y. M. Collet, Paul R. Crocker, Margherita Fais, Rositsa Karamanska, Balaram Mukhopadhayay, Sergey A. Nepogodiev, Abdul Rashid, Martin Rejzek, David A. Russell, Claire L. Schofield, and Renate M. van Well, ACS Symposium Series, Chapter 9, 2011, pp 143–159.

Awards 

 ACCTI Dr. H.C. Srivastava Memorial Award 2017 given by Association of Carbohydrate Chemists and Technologists India (ACCTI).
 Excellence in Carbohydrates Research Award 2018 given by Association of Carbohydrate Chemists and Technologists India (ACCTI)

References 

21st-century Indian chemists
Scientists from West Bengal
1973 births
Living people
People from Bankura district
University of Burdwan alumni